Georgakis is a Greek name, which can be used as either a surname or a given name. Notable people with this name include:

Christos Georgakis, American chemical engineer
George Georgakis, founder of AMG International
Georgios Georgakis (born 1991), Greek professional basketball player
Heather Georgakis, former dean of Santa Barbara & Ventura Colleges of Law
Ioannis Georgakis, founder of the Hellenic Foundation for Culture
Kostas Georgakis (1948-1970), Greek student of geology who set himself on fire in protest against Georgios Papadopoulos
Nikos Georgakis, Greek actor and director

As a first name
Georgakis Kapsokalyvas (born c. 1800), fighter in the Greek Revolution

See also 
 Georgiou
 Georgescu
 Gheorghiu
 Iordache (< Georgakis, Georgakes)